Roh Yoon-seo (born 25 January 2000) is a South Korean actress and model. She is best known for her roles in the television series Our Blues (2022), Crash Course in Romance (2023) and the film 20th Century Girl (2022).

Education
Roh Yoon-seo is currently a student at Ewha Womans University, where she majors in Fine Arts. Roh was formerly educated at Jamjeon Elementary School, Jungshin Girls' Middle School, and Sunhwa Arts School.

Career
Roh Yoon-seo started out her career as a model for cosmetics advertisements in 2018, including "Allure Korea".

Roh made her acting debut in 2022, as she was cast as Bang Yeong-ju, a pregnant high school student in the popular tvN drama Our Blues. Despite the controversy surrounding the drama's subplot of teenage pregnancy, Roh nonetheless garnered attention from the audiences for her portrayal and her emotional acting, including the portrayal of the emotional struggles behind teenage pregnancy. From this debut role, Roh demonstrated stable and gifted acting skills for a rookie, which won the hearts of the audience.

Later the same year, Roh starred in the Netflix film  20th Century Girl. Within three days of its release, the film debuted at No. 2 on Netflix's global chart of Top 10 non-English language film category for the week of its release, with eight million hours viewed, as well as positive reception to the film's plot.

In 2023, Roh starred in the hit tvN drama Crash Course in Romance. Both Our Blues and Crash Course in Romance are amongst the highest rated Korean drama on cable television in South Korea.

Filmography

Films

Television series

Music video appearances

Awards and nominations

References

External links
 Official website 
 

2000 births
21st-century South Korean actresses
Living people
Ewha Womans University alumni